Djaouna is a village in the Boumerdès Province in Kabylie, Algeria.

Location
The village is surrounded by Isser River and the towns of Issers and Thénia.

Notable people

References

Villages in Algeria
Boumerdès Province
Kabylie